The Bulla Regia Museum is an archaeological museum in Bulla Regia, Tunisia.

North-western Tunisia is home to the archaeological site Bulla Regia. The location is renowned for its semi-subterranean houses from the Hadrianic era. Many of the mosaic floors are still in their original locations, and you can see others at the Bardo Museum in Tunis. The location is also connected to a tiny museum.

See also

Culture of Tunisia
List of museums in Tunisia

References

External links

Museums with year of establishment missing
Archaeological museums in Tunisia
Jendouba Governorate